is a Japanese former Nippon Professional Baseball pitcher.

References

External links

 Career statistics - NPB.jp 
 91 Masahiro Sakumoto PLAYERS2021 - Fukuoka SoftBank Hawks Official site

1974 births
Living people
Baseball people from Okinawa Prefecture 
Japanese baseball players
Nippon Professional Baseball pitchers
Fukuoka Daiei Hawks players
Hanshin Tigers players
Yokohama BayStars players
Japanese baseball coaches
Nippon Professional Baseball coaches